Lakhi may refer to:

 Dafi (also known as Lākhī)
 Lukhi, Fariman (also known as Lākhī)
 Lakhi, Sindh - (a town in Shikarpur District of Sindh)